2100 series may refer to the following Japanese train types:

 Chikuho Electric Railroad 2100 series electric multiple unit operated on the Chikuhō Electric Railroad Line
 Ichibata Electric Railway 2100 series EMU
 Izukyū Corporation 2100 series EMU
 Iyotetsu 2100 series streetcar
 Kanto Railway KiHa 2100 series DMU
 Keikyu 2100 series EMU, introduced in 1998
 Keisei 2100 series EMU; see 
 Nagano Electric Railway 2100 series EMU, introduced in 2011
 Odakyu 2100 series EMU, see Odakyu 2000 series